Concordia Lutheran High School may refer to:

Concordia Lutheran High School (Fort Wayne, Indiana) 
Concordia Lutheran High School (Texas), Tomball, Texas